USS Coronet (SP-194) was an armed motorboat that served in the United States Navy as a patrol vessel from 1917 to 1919.
 
Coronet was built as a civilian motorboat in 1905 at Morris Heights, New York. The U.S. Navy acquired her on 20 July 1917 for use as a patrol boat during World War I. She was commissioned on 24 September 1917 as USS Coronet (SP-194).

Coronet was assigned to the 3rd Naval District, where she performed patrol duty for the remainder of World War I.

On 5 August 1919, Coronet was stricken from the Navy Directory and sold.

References

Department of the Navy Naval Historical Center Online Library of Selected Images: U.S. Navy Ships: USS Coronet (SP-194), 1917–1919. Originally the civilian motor boat Coronet (1905)
NavSource Online: Section Patrol Craft Photo Archive: Coronet (SP 194)

Patrol vessels of the United States Navy
World War I patrol vessels of the United States
Ships built in Morris Heights, Bronx
1905 ships